Luton is a village in Devon, England, within Teignbridge local authority area. Historically Luton formed part of Ashcombe Hundred.

The village is in the parish of Bishopsteignton, but has a chapel of ease, dedicated to St John the Evangelist, built in the 19th century. The village is within Kenn Deanery for ecclesiastical purposes.

The chapel is a Grade II listed building, as are the lych gate and a tomb in the churchyard.   Other listed buildings in the village include the Old Mill, a former watermill inoperative since the 1880s and now a private house, and Ivy Cottage, a 17th- or 18th-century thatched cottage.

The village contains a public house, the Elizabethan Inn.

References

External links

Villages in Devon
Teignbridge